Carmen Anita Chalá Quilumba (born June 7, 1976) is a judoka and former field athlete from Ecuador.

Early life, family and education
Carmen was born in the Ecuadoran province Carchi but at heart she is from Manabí. Her family has many athletes in it: older sister Eva, and younger sisters Diana and Vanessa have all been national judo team members.

Athletic career
Carmen Chalá was a national champion in athletics in shot put and discus throw. However, by 1995, realizing that there are not many chances to be a successful field athlete at an international level, she began learning and practicing judo. She was 29 years old, considered very late to begin an endeavor like that. Her older sister Eva Chalá inspired her to try judo as she was already involved in it herself; Eva later became a referee for the sport as well.

After only a month of judo training, Carmen became a national heavyweight champion. In the final, she defeated Olympian María Cangá, whom Carmen considered the nation's top female judo athlete.

Although her success has been primarily within South American contests, Chalá participated at three Olympic Games but won only one match, defeating Sandra Köppen of Germany at the 2004 Olympic Games. In 2009, she wanted to join in politics but later delayed her candidature. She decided to continue as an athlete, aspiring to participate in the 2012 Olympic Games in London, but she did not.

Achievements

References

External links 
 Carmen Chalá on Facebook
 
 
 
 

1976 births
Living people
Ecuadorian female judoka
Judoka at the 2000 Summer Olympics
Judoka at the 2004 Summer Olympics
Judoka at the 2008 Summer Olympics
Athletes (track and field) at the 1995 Pan American Games
Judoka at the 1999 Pan American Games
Judoka at the 2003 Pan American Games
Judoka at the 2007 Pan American Games
Olympic judoka of Ecuador
Pan American Games silver medalists for Ecuador
Pan American Games bronze medalists for Ecuador
Pan American Games medalists in judo
South American Games gold medalists for Ecuador
South American Games silver medalists for Ecuador
South American Games bronze medalists for Ecuador
South American Games medalists in athletics
South American Games medalists in judo
Competitors at the 1990 South American Games
Competitors at the 2002 South American Games
Competitors at the 2006 South American Games
Competitors at the 2010 South American Games
Medalists at the 2003 Pan American Games
Medalists at the 2007 Pan American Games
Ecuadorian female athletes
20th-century Ecuadorian women
21st-century Ecuadorian women